UFC Fight Night: Smith vs. Teixeira was a planned mixed martial arts event produced by the Ultimate Fighting Championship originally planned to take place on April 25, 2020 at Pinnacle Bank Arena in Lincoln, Nebraska, United States. Due to the COVID-19 pandemic, UFC president Dana White announced on April 9 that starting with UFC 249, all future events were indefinitely postponed. The event was officially cancelled on April 20.

Background
A light heavyweight bout between former UFC Light Heavyweight Championship challengers Anthony Smith and Glover Teixeira was expected to serve as the event headliner.

A lightweight bout between Christos Giagos and Alan Patrick was scheduled for the event. However, Giagos pulled out of the fight on March 19 citing injury and was replaced by Frank Camacho.

A light heavyweight bout between former interim title challenger Ovince Saint Preux and Shamil Gamzatov was scheduled for the event. However, Gamzatov was forced to pull out of the event due to travel restrictions related to the COVID-19 pandemic. He was replaced by Ion Cuțelaba.

A heavyweight bout between Rodrigo Nascimento and Don’Tale Mayes was expected to take place at UFC Fight Night: Overeem vs. Harris. However, the event was cancelled due to the COVID-19 pandemic. The pairing was rescheduled for this event.

Also due to travel restrictions, some Brazilian fighters were unable to compete due to visa issues on the original date – Ariane Carnelossi (who was expected to face Mackenzie Dern in a women's strawweight bout) and Raphael Pessoa (who was expected to face Alexander Romanov in a heavyweight bout). Carnelossi was replaced by Hannah Cifers.

Cancelled fight card

See also 

 List of UFC events
 List of current UFC fighters
 2020 in UFC

References 
 

UFC Fight Night
Mixed martial arts in Nebraska
Sports in Lincoln, Nebraska
April 2020 sports events in the United States
2020 in mixed martial arts
2020 in sports in Nebraska
Cancelled Ultimate Fighting Championship events
UFC Fight Night